Greensboro is a city in North Carolina, U.S.

Greensboro may also refer to:

Greensboro, Alabama
Greensboro, Florida
Greensboro, Georgia
Greensboro, Indiana
Greensboro, Maryland
Greensboro, Pennsylvania
Greensboro, Vermont, a New England town
Greensboro (CDP), Vermont, the central village in the town
Greensboro station (Washington Metro)
USS Greensboro (PF-101), a United States Navy patrol frigate in commission from 1945 to 1946

See also
Greensborough (disambiguation)